Derek Robertson (12 February 1949 – 29 January 2015) was a Scottish footballer who played as a goalkeeper and played his entire senior career with St Johnstone.

The Glasgow-born Robertson joined St Johnstone in 1966 from junior outfit Petershill and made 235 appearances for the Muirton Park club before finally retiring in 1979.

Death
Robertson died, aged 65, on 29 January 2015 from a respiratory infection while battling cancer.

References

1949 births
2015 deaths
Scottish footballers
St Johnstone F.C. players
Footballers from Glasgow
Place of death missing
Deaths from cancer in Scotland
Association football goalkeepers
Scottish Football League players
Petershill F.C. players